Anne Kenney is an American television writer and producer. She was an executive producer and writer for Outlander. She worked extensively on L.A. Law in both capacities. Her other television credits include Family Law, Beautiful People, The Division, ER, Hellcats, Switched at Birth, Outlander, and American Gods.

She was born in Beaverton, Oregon and is an alumna of Ohio University.

References

External links
 

American women television producers
American television writers
Living people
Marist College alumni
People from Beaverton, Oregon
American women television writers
Year of birth missing (living people)
Ohio University alumni
Screenwriters from Oregon
Television producers from Oregon
21st-century American women